Eun-young, also spelled Eun-yeong is a Korean feminine given name. The meaning differs based on the hanja used to write each syllable of the name. There are 26 hanja with the reading "eun" and 34 hanja with the reading "young" on the South Korean government's official list of hanja which may be used in personal names. It was the eighth-most popular name for baby girls born in South Korea in 1980.

People with this name include:

Sportspeople
Nam Eun-young (born 1970), South Korean team handball player
Cho Eun-young (born 1972), South Korean sport shooter
Lee Eun-young (field hockey) (born 1974), South Korean field hockey player
Lee Eun-young (taekwondo), South Korean taekwondo athlete

Entertainers
WoongSan (born Kim Eun-young, 1973), South Korean jazz musician
Cheetah (rapper) (born Kim Eun-young, 1990), South Korean rapper
Oh Eun-young (born 1985), South Korean television hostess
Ben (South Korean singer) (born Lee Eun-young, 1991), South Korean singer

Other
Choi Eun-young (born 1984), South Korean writer
Song Eunyoung, South Korean fashion designer, co-founder of E. Y. Wada

Fictional characters
Eun-yeong, lead character of the 2008 South Korean film Beautiful
Ahn Eun-young, titular character of the 2020 South Korean drama School Nurse Ahn Eun-young

See also
List of Korean given names

References

Korean feminine given names